Anastasia Igorevna Golubeva (born 3 January 2006) is a Russian pair skater who currently represents Australia. With her skating partner, Hektor Giotopoulos Moore, she is the 2022 CS Warsaw Cup champion. 

On the junior level, Golubeva/Giotopoulos Moore are a two-time World silver medalist (2022 and 2023) and the 2022–23 Junior Grand Prix Final champions.

Programs

With Giotopoulos Moore

Competitive highlights 
CS: Challenger Series; JGP: Junior Grand Prix

With Giotopoulos Moore for Australia

References

External links 
 

2006 births
Living people
Australian female pair skaters
Russian female pair skaters
Figure skaters from Moscow
World Junior Figure Skating Championships medalists